Division No. 1, Subdivision F is an unorganized subdivision on the Avalon Peninsula in Newfoundland and Labrador, Canada. It is in Division 1 and contains the unincorporated communities of New Chelsea-New Melbourne-Brownsdale-Sibley's Cove-Lead Cove, Turks Cove

New Chelsea-New Melbourne-Brownsdale-Sibley's Cove-Lead Cove
See: New Chelsea-New Melbourne-Brownsdale-Sibley's Cove-Lead Cove

Turks Cove

Turks Cove was a settlement in Trinity District. The first postmistress was Bridget Moore. 
Other Post Mistrisses include Anastasia Antle and Alice Ryan who was postmaster for 30 years up until 1972

There are Coates, Antles, Ryans, Conways, Moores, Kellys and Samms in the cove. The community has never had more than 60 people and now, due to the job opportunities in Alberta, population stands at less than 30.

The cove is semi-circular and has some fantastic scenery. Local trees are small, close to the ocean, but a kilometre or so inland there is enough for firewood as well as lumber for houses and boat building.

There were a few fishermen left in the 1960s but their methods could not keep up with the higher technology and larger vessels used by others and it has slowed to where now only one, Trevor Kelly, remains. Fishing even up to 1972 was carried out with 16th century methods because the poverty of the local people could not allow expansion and purchase of little more than cod traps.

The harbour is open and vulnerable to the most severe of all winds, those from the North West. Stages, wharves and boats disappear during the tail ends of hurricanes or even squalls, but worse was the arctic ice that invade each spring. Even after the disastrous Newfoundland Light and Power "Live Better Electrically" campaign, people continued to heat with wood. Electric ranges did take a hold eventually though and most houses now have electric heat backing up wood.

A one-room school served as a means of education until 1964 when the Catholic system closed and bussed students to the nearby town of Winterton.

Newfoundland and Labrador subdivisions